Guanqian may refer to the following locations in China:

 Guanqian, Chizhou (观前镇), town in Guichi District, Chizhou, Anhui
 Guanqian, Changting County (馆前镇), town in Changting County, Fujian
 Guanqian, Youxi County (管前镇), town in Youxi County, Fujian